During the Parade of Nations at the opening ceremony of the 2012 Summer Paralympic Games, athletes from each participating country paraded in the Olympic Stadium, preceded by its flag. The flag was borne by a sportsperson from that country chosen either by the National Paralympic Committee or by the athletes themselves.

Parade order
All nations paraded in alphabetical order except the host country, Great Britain, who entered last.

Countries and flag bearers 
The following is a list of all parading countries with their respective flag bearer, sorted in the order they appeared in the parade.  This is sortable by country name under which they entered, the flag bearer's name, or the flag bearer's sport. Names are given as were officially designated by the IPC.

See also
 2012 Summer Olympics national flag bearers

References

Parade of Nations
Lists of Paralympic flag bearers
Parades in London